Oscar Goerke, Jr. (January 10, 1883 – December 12, 1934) was an American cyclist who competed in the early twentieth century. He was born in Brooklyn and died in Maplewood, New Jersey. Goerke competed in all seven events in cycling at the 1904 Summer Olympics in Missouri and won the silver in the 2 mile race.

References

External links
Profile

1883 births
1934 deaths
American male cyclists
Cyclists at the 1904 Summer Olympics
Olympic silver medalists for the United States in cycling
Medalists at the 1904 Summer Olympics
19th-century American people
20th-century American people